The Shangyang, (or shang yang) in Chinese mythology was a rainbird (i.e. it could predict rain). It was one of several important mythical birds in this tradition. The Shangyang was particularly associated with the Lord of Rain, Yu Shi. Once the Shangyang was supposed to have visited the royal court at Qi, where it performed a dance upon its one leg, whereupon an embassy was sent inquire of the meaning of this event to Confucius in the neighboring state of Lu: the Shangyang was known to Confucius, who predicted imminent heavy rain and advised the digging of drainage and the raising of dikes. As a result of following the sage's advise, Qi was spared calamity due to the ensuing inundation, whereas the other states who did not heed the advice were heavily damaged. This legendary incident has been often used to illustrate the folly of those who refuse to heed the words of the wise. Mythographer Lihui Yang associates Yu Shi with the Bi Fang bird, instead.

See also
Chinese mythology
Qingniao
Three-legged crow

Notes

References
Christie, Anthony (1968). Chinese Mythology. Feltham: Hamlyn Publishing. .
Yang, Lihui, et al. (2005). Handbook of Chinese Mythology. New York: Oxford University Press. 

Mythological and legendary Chinese birds
Legendary creatures with absent body parts